Gertrud Meyen (1919–2012) was a German stage and film actress. She was also a voice actor, dubbing foreign-language films for release in Germany. She was married to the actor Heinz Engelmann.

Selected filmography
 The Merciful Lie (1939)
 Midsummer Night's Fire (1939)
 Doctor Crippen (1942)
 Geheimakten Solvay (1953)

References

Bibliography
 Goble, Alan. The Complete Index to Literary Sources in Film. Walter de Gruyter, 1999.

External links

1919 births
2012 deaths
German film actresses
German stage actresses
Actors from Dortmund